Sheila Bromberg (1928–2021) was a British harpist who performed in both classical and popular settings. She is best known for playing on the Beatles’ song "She's Leaving Home", off of their 1967 album Sgt. Pepper's Lonely Hearts Club Band.

Early life
Sheila Zelda Patricia Bromberg was born on 2 September 1928 in London, England, the daughter of Michael Bromberg and Rose Lyons. Her father was an orchestral viola player who at one time played with the Scottish National Orchestra, and her mother was a seamstress. Her family was Jewish.

Education
Bromberg studied the piano from an early age, becoming an accomplished pianist, and later she studied the harp at London’s Royal College of Music, where she graduated in 1949. At age 70 she received a degree from the University of Greenwich in music therapy.

Career
Bromberg played harp in the London Philharmonic Orchestra, the Royal Philharmonic Orchestra, the BBC Concert Orchestra, and the Royal Liverpool Philharmonic. She also performed in the orchestra for the London run of the musical Phantom of the Opera, and she played harp on two James Bond films in the 1960s, Dr. No and Goldfinger. In addition, she earned regular wages as a session musician for popular artists such as Frank Sinatra, Bing Crosby, the Bee Gees, Dusty Springfield, and Sammy Davis Jr.

In March 1967, Bromberg was hired to play the harp on the Abbey Road studio recording of "She's Leaving Home", one of the songs on the Beatles’ Sgt. Pepper's Lonely Hearts Club Band album. This made her the first woman to appear on a Beatles song. Her playing on the song has been said to “define the piece”.

She was a member of the BBC’s Top of the Pops orchestra in the 1960s and 1970s, considered to be England’s most popular music television program during that time period. She also played the signature introduction on the recording of "Boogie Nights’’, a hit single in 1976 by the disco band Heatwave.

Bromberg was an orchestra regular on the highly rated British television show Morecambe and Wise, and she also appeared in many commercials as well as in a Monty Python’s Flying Circus sketch, where she played the harp in a wheelbarrow.

Personal life
Bromberg married Sydney Laurence in 1949, but they later divorced. She had two children, Naomi Venables and David Laurence, and five grandchildren.  Her cousin is the American musician and songwriter David Bromberg.

Death
Bromberg died on August 17, 2021, in Aylesbury, England.

References

1928 births
2021 deaths
English Jews
English classical harpists
Alumni of the Royal College of Music
Alumni of the University of Greenwich
Musicians from London